Frontalis  may refer to:
 Crista frontalis, the frontal crest, a crest on the internal surface of the squama frontalis of the frontal bone
 Frontalis muscle, a thin, quadrilateral fascia muscle located on the front of the head
 Sinus frontalis, the frontal sinus, mucosa-lined airspaces within the bones of the face and skull
 Squama frontalis, two surfaces of the squama of the frontal bone
 Sutura frontalis, the frontal suture, a dense connective tissue structure that divides the two halves of the frontal bone of the skull in infants and children

Subspecies
 Bos gaurus frontalis, a subspecies of the gaur, a wild bovine animal of South Asia and Southeast Asia
 Chloropsis aurifrons frontalis, a subspecies in the species Chloropsis aurifrons, the golden-fronted leafbird, a bird

See also 
 Occipitofrontalis muscle, a muscle which covers parts of the skull